Rex Clive Richards (4 February 1934 – 6 March 1989) was a Welsh international rugby union player. He gained his only cap against France at Cardiff on 24 March 1956, Wales winning 5–3. He played for Cross Keys RFC until 1955 before heading to Hollywood to try to make his fortune as an actor.

He had a number of roles, including the King of Wongo in Wild Women of Wongo in 1958. In 2008, the film was given a special screening in Cross Keys, where Richards had spent his playing career; it was the first time the film had been shown in the town.

Richards narrowly missed out on at least one role that would have made him internationally famous. He auditioned to play Tarzan and out of 1,000 people he got down to the final two, just missing out to Gordon Scott.

His nephew Julian Richards is a film director.

References

External links

1934 births
1989 deaths
20th-century Welsh male actors
Cross Keys RFC players
Monmouthshire County RFC players
Rugby union players from Newport, Wales
Rugby union props
Wales international rugby union players
Welsh male film actors
Welsh rugby union players